Jimmy Carter incident may refer to:

 Jimmy Carter UFO incident
 Jimmy Carter rabbit incident